Google Flights is an online flight booking search service that facilitates the purchase of airline tickets through third-party suppliers. It was launched by Google in 2011 following a buyout. It is now part of Google Travel.

History
In April 2011, the United States Department of Justice Antitrust Division approved Google's $700 million purchase of ITA Software.  On September 13, 2011, Google launched Google Flights, which used algorithms gained from this purchase.

Features
An innovation of Google Flights is that it allows open-ended searches based on criteria other than the destination; for example, a user may search for flights within a range of times and a budget and be offered various destination choices. Alternatively, a user can select a destination, and Google Flights will calculate every price for each day of the next 12 months, visualized in a graph or table. This allows users to easily spot the cheapest date to fly to the destination.

Google Flights also enables its users to calculate the climate impact of their flight, but in July 2022, this tool changed the way of calculating the climate impact of flights. All the global warming impacts of flying except the CO2 emission were excluded from the calculation, halving the calculated climate impact of each flight. This move faced a backlash from environmental activists and the scientific community.

Response
The service was immediately compared to competitors such as Expedia, Orbitz, Kayak.com, and Bing.

Shortly after the site launched, Expedia testified to the Senate Judiciary Antitrust Subcommittee that Google failed to keep a promise to rank Google Flight listings below the listings of competitors in a Google search.

International availability 

 Albania
 Armenia
 Australia
 Azerbaijan
 Belarus
 Belgium
 Bosnia and Herzegovina
 Brazil
 Bulgaria
 Canada
 Chile
 Croatia
 Cyprus
 Czech Republic
 Estonia
 Finland
 France
 Georgia

 Germany
 Greece
 Greenland
 Hungary
 Iceland
 India
 Indonesia
 Ireland
 Israel
 Italy
 Latvia
 Lithuania
 Luxembourg
 Macedonia
 Malaysia
Mauritius
 Mexico
 Moldova

 Montenegro
 Netherlands
 New Zealand
 Nigeria
 Norway
 Peru
 Poland
 Portugal
 Romania
 Russia
 Serbia
 Singapore
 Slovakia
 Slovenia
 Spain
 Sweden
 Turkey
 Switzerland
 Ukraine
 United Kingdom
 United States

References

External links
 

Online travel agencies
American travel websites
Travel ticket search engines
Flights
Computer-related introductions in 2011